Tunes may refer to:

Places and jurisdictions 
 Tunes (Silves), a parish in Portugal
 Tunes, Norway, a village in Norway
 Tunes, Tunisia, now Tunis, eponymous capital city of Tunisia
 Tunes (see), a suppressed Latin Catholic titular bishopric; see Catholic Church in Tunisia

Music 
 Music
 iTunes, music software
 Tunes (album), an album by Spiers and Boden
 MC Tunes (born 1970), British rapper

Other uses
 Tunes (confectionery), a brand of cough sweets in the UK 
 Tunes (bug), a genus of assassin bug in the tribe Harpactorini
 Looney Tunes, a cartoon

See also 
 
 
 Tune (disambiguation)
 Tunis (disambiguation)

pt:Tunes